Arthur Tiley (17 January 1910 – 5 June 1994) was a British businessman and Conservative and National Liberal politician. Upon the re-creation of the Bradford West constituency in 1955, Tiley was elected as its Member of Parliament. He held the seat until his defeat at the 1966 general election by Labour's Norman Haseldine. He was the MP for Bradford during the city's smallpox outbreak in 1962.

Early life and education
Arthur Tiley was born in Bradford on 17 January 1910. He was educated at the Grange High School in Bradford.

Career
Tiley had a career in business before entering politics. Between 1934 and 1950, he was treasurer of the Young Women's Christian Association in Bradford. From 1939 to 1945, he was senior company officer for the National Fire Service.

He was Conservative and National Liberal politician. Upon the re-creation of the Bradford West constituency in 1955, Tiley was elected as its Member of Parliament. He held the seat until his defeat at the 1966 general election by Labour's Norman Haseldine.

He was the MP for Bradford during the city's smallpox outbreak in 1962. Following the outbreak, his speech in parliament included details of Bradford's losses in its textile trade.

From 1964 to 1966, he was opposition spokesman on Pensions and National Insurance.

His later career focussed on his insurance business.

Personal life
In 1936, he married Mary Tankard and they had one son and one daughter. He was appointed a CBE in 1972.

Death
Tiley died on 5 June 1994.

References

External links 
 

1910 births
1994 deaths
Conservative Party (UK) MPs for English constituencies
UK MPs 1955–1959
UK MPs 1959–1964
UK MPs 1964–1966
Members of Parliament for Bradford West
English justices of the peace
British businesspeople in insurance
20th-century British businesspeople